This is a list of episodes for the 1990 television series Zorro. There were 88 episodes (approx: 24mins each). First season episodes 8-13 "The Legend Begins" was released as a video with some extended footage. Fourth season episodes 10-13 released as a video "A Conspiracy of Blood" with some extended footage.

Series overview

Pilot episode

Episodes

Season 1 (1990)
Filmed at studios outside Madrid, Spain.

Season 2 (1990–91)

Season 3 (1991–92)

Season 4 (1992–93)

External links

New World Zorro

Lists of action television series episodes
Lists of American drama television series episodes
Lists of American Western (genre) television series episodes